Belden G. Bly Bridge originally known as the Fox Hill Bridge was built in 1912 and renamed in 1985 in honor of former member of the Massachusetts House of Representatives Belden Bly. At the time of its demolition, the bridge was the oldest cantilever bridge in the United States still in use as well as the oldest Scherzer Rolling Lift under the supervision of the Massachusetts Department of Public Works. Streetcar tracks originally ran across the bridge.

This bridge closed for several months for repairs on 15 December 2008. The MBTA bus routes 424, 450, 455 and 459 had their routes detoured through Austin Square in West Lynn through Ballard Street in Saugus.

While the bridge was scheduled to be closed for replacement starting in early 2013, problems with the temporary cable-lift draw bridge delayed the project significantly. (On June 3, 2013, a hinge failed on the temporary draw span during what was supposed to have been final testing.) The temporary bridge was finally opened on Nov. 9, 2013, and the 1912 span closed permanently. (On Nov. 12 2013 the temporary bridge was stuck in the open position for many hours, so it is unclear if the 1912 bridge is truly ready for demolition.)

Nearly a decade later, the temporary bridge is still in use.

External links
Belden Bly Bridge Replacement project photo
Google Street View showing the Scherzer Rolling Lift mechanism

http://www.wickedlocal.com/saugus/newsnow/x1275641189/Construction-alert-for-Belden-Bly-Bridge-on-Saugus-Lynn-line

https://web.archive.org/web/20070829002347/http://hodge.iiiii.nu/industry---photos/bridges.html 
https://web.archive.org/web/20061010155109/http://www.dla.org/downloads/Hearsay0305.doc

Buildings and structures in Saugus, Massachusetts
Bridges completed in 1912
Bridges in Essex County, Massachusetts
Road bridges in Massachusetts
1912 establishments in Massachusetts
Cantilever bridges in the United States